The 2002 NCAA Division I women's volleyball tournament began on December 5, 2002 with 64 teams and concluded on December 21 when Southern California defeated Stanford 3 games to 1 in New Orleans, Louisiana for the program's second NCAA title and fifth overall national title.

It was Southern California's first national title since 1981, while Stanford was the defending 2001 national champion.  Semifinalist Hawaii was making the program's seventh NCAA final four appearance, while Florida made the program's first final four appearance in four years.

Records
The conference champion from each of 31 conferences earned a bid to the 2002 NCAA Volleyball Tournament, along with 33 at-large bids. The Big Ten and Pac-10 led all conferences with eight bids each. In all, ten conferences had a team ranked in the top 16 of the tournament. As of 2017, this is the most conferences represented by seeded teams in a single tournament in the 64-team era (since 1998).

West Regional (Santa Barbara)

East Regional (Gainesville)

Central Regional (Lincoln)

Pacific Regional (Stanford)

Final Four – New Orleans Arena, New Orleans, Louisiana

National Semifinals

Southern California vs. Florida

When Florida took the first set, it was the first time in 6 NCAA Semifinal appearances that a Florida team was able to win a single set. However, the rest didn't go their way as USC won the next three to advance to the national championship. In the deciding fourth set, USC took the 16-8 lead before Florida came back to cut the lead to 19-17, but the Gators were unable to take the lead before USC won the fourth set, 30-24 and the match.

Stanford vs. Hawaii

Stanford got a chance to defend their 2001 NCAA title after dismantling Hawaii, 3-0. The 3-0 loss was only Hawaii's second loss of the season, with their other loss coming to Stanford in a 3-0 sweep in the preseason. Ogonna Nnamani led Stanford with 15 kills, while Hawaii was led by Kim Willoughby who had 22 kills.

National Championship: Southern California vs. Stanford 

USC dethroned defending NCAA national champion Stanford in a 3-1 match to finish the season 31-1, with their only loss coming to Stanford. In set one, USC had 22 kills while Stanford had just 8, leading them to a 30-27 victory. In set two, Stanford came back to take 9 of the first 12 points en route to the easy 30-23.

USC sprinted to the 19-10 lead in set 3, before the Cardinal cut the advantage at 20-17. USC's offense proved to be too much, as they won it 30-24. In set 4, USC cruised out to an early 6-1 lead and then 17-11. The lead soon disappeared, with Stanford tying it up at 19, before USC pulled away again to win the fourth set 30-26 and take home the national title. It was USC's first national championship since 1981, the first year that NCAA started to sponsor women's volleyball.

References

NCAA Women's Volleyball Championship
NCAA
Volleyball
Volleyball in New Orleans
2002 in sports in Louisiana
December 2002 sports events in the United States